= Angelina Ngalula =

Angelina Ngalula is a Tanzanian entrepreneur, businesswoman, and leader of private-sector organisations in Tanzania. She is the founder of Bravo Group Limited, a logistics company, and Agricom Africa, a company specialising in the distribution of agricultural equipment.

Ngalula is also known for her leadership in private-sector representation, having served as Chairperson and Acting President of the Tanzania Private Sector Foundation (TPSF) and as Chairperson of the East African Business Council (EABC).

== Career and Leadership ==
Ngalula began her business activities in Tanzania's transportation and agricultural sectors. She founded Bravo Group Limited, a company specialising in long-distance freight transportation, which also began commercial cargo operations through the TAZARA railway in 2024.She is also the founder of Agricom Africa, a company involved in the distribution of agricultural equipment. Additionally, she founded Bravo Coco, a beachfront leisure and hospitality destination in Tanzania.

As a leader of TPSF and EABC, Ngalula has represented regional business interests. In 2023, she addressed the 14th African Union High-Level Private Sector Summit in Nairobi, Kenya, advocating for the development of a more favourable business environment across Africa. In June 2024, she represented the private sector at the Tanzania–Singapore Investment Forum, which was attended by senior leaders from both countries.

== Views and Advocacy ==
Ngalula has advocated for women's rights and participation in Tanzania's business sector, emphasising that cultural traditions and gender roles should not prevent women from establishing their own businesses.

On taxation and business policy, she has called on the government to protect local entrepreneurs from unfair competition by foreign traders in sectors reserved for Tanzanian citizens. These calls were followed several months later by legal changes regulating foreign participation in certain business activities in the country.

== Awards and Recognition ==
In March 2023, Ngalula received the "Malkia wa Nguvu" (Queen of Power) Award in the business leadership category in Tanzania, in recognition of her efforts to promote and advocate for the private sector.
